The Taipei Metro Mingde station (formerly transliterated as Mingte Station until 2003, traditional Chinese: 捷運明德站) is located in the Beitou District (北投區) of Taipei, Taiwan.  The station is on the Tamsui Line, otherwise known as "the red line" by locals. It is also a minor bus transfer point for connections to Tianmu (天母) and Yangmingshan National Park (陽明山).

Station overview

The two-level, elevated station structure with one island platform and one exit, situated between Donghua Street (東華街) and Xi'an Street (西安街) at the midsection of Mingde Road (明德路).

Originally, it was planned to be called "Tianmu Station," but was changed before the station opened on 28 March 1997.

Station layout

First and Last Train Timing 
The first and last train timing at Mingde station  is as follows:

References

1997 establishments in Taiwan
Tamsui–Xinyi line stations
Railway stations opened in 1997